The 2021–22 FA Youth Cup was the 70th edition of the FA Youth Cup.

The competition consisted of several rounds and was preceded by a qualifying competition, starting with two preliminary rounds which is followed by 3 qualifying rounds for non-League teams. Football League teams enter the draw thereafter, with League One and League Two teams entered at the first round Proper, and Premier League and Championship teams entered at the Third round proper.

610 teams were accepted into the FA Youth Cup.

Calendar

Competition proper

First round 
The League One and League Two teams enter the first round Proper with the 39 non league winners from the qualifying rounds joining them for this round. Only Barrow AFC, Crawley Town, and Wycombe Wanderers did not participate from League One and League Two because the three did not apply. Hartlepool United vs. Bolton Wanderers was initially drawn, but Hartlepool withdrew from the tournament, granting Bolton a bye to the next round.

Second round 
40 teams play this round with all the winners from the previous round participating.

Third round 
64 teams compete in the Third round with the 43 Premier League and EFL Championship Clubs appearing this round along with the 21 winners from the previous round. Only Brentford from the EFL Championship did not participate as they did not apply for the tournament.

Fourth round 
32 teams participate in the Fourth round proper with all 32 winners from the previous round participating.

Fifth round 
16 teams participate in the Fifth round proper with all 16 winners from the previous round participating.

Quarter-finals 
8 teams participate in the Quarter-finals with all 8 winners from the previous round participating.

Semi-finals 
4 teams participate in the Semi-finals with all 4 winners from the previous round participating.

Final 
The winners of the Semi-finals play this match to determine the winner of the FA Youth Cup.

 
 

 
 
 
|-
|colspan=4|Substitutes:
|-
 
 
 
 
 

|-
|colspan=4|Coach:  Travis Binnion
|-

 
 

 
 
 
 

 
|-
|colspan=4|Substitutes:
|-

 
 
 
 

 
|-
|colspan=4|Coach:  Warren Joyce
|-

References

External links 
 The FA Youth Cup at The Football Association official website

FA Youth Cup seasons
Cup